Uniplus+ is a discontinued commercial version of the Unix System III and System V operating systems. It was available in the 1980s. It ran on the MC68000 Motorola chipset on Torch Triple X, the Apple Lisa, among other machines. It was released by UniSoft.

Notes

References

External links

UNIX System V
Unix variants
68k architecture